The 2016–17 season was PEC Zwolle's 106th season of play, it marked its 15th season in the Eredivisie and its fifth consecutive season in the top flight of Dutch football.

Competitions

Friendlies

Eredivisie

League table

Results summary

KNVB Cup

Statistics

Squad details and appearances

Goalscorers

Transfers

In

Out

References

PEC Zwolle seasons
PEC Zwolle